The Maritime Reserve is a term used to group together the Royal Naval Reserve (RNR) and Royal Marines Reserve (RMR). The RNR and RMR form part of the British Armed Forces Volunteer Reserves.

History
After 1976 and the dissolution of the post of Admiral Commanding, Reserves, responsibility for administering reserves then came under the Commander-in-Chief, Naval Home Command until 1994. From 1994-1996 the Second Sea Lord became responsible for managing reserves. Later that year the new post of Flag Officer, Training and Recruitment took over responsibility for reserves until 2004. In 2005 the Flag Officer Scotland and Northern Ireland became responsible for the Royal Naval Reserve, holding the joint title of Flag Officer, Reserves. In 2015 the Naval Secretary/Assistant Chief of the Naval Staff (Policy) assumed responsibility for reserves and the post was renamed Flag Officer, Maritime Reserves.

As of February 2020, the current head of the Maritime Reserve is Commodore Mel Robinson.

Commander Maritime Reserves

The head of the Maritime Reserve is Commander Maritime Reserves (COMMARRES) and holds the rank of commodore. The following have served in that role:

 –2012: John Keegan
 2012–2013: Gareth Derrick
 2013–2016: Andrew Jameson
 2016–2020: Martin Quinn
 2020–present: Mel Robinson

See also
Royal Navy
Royal Marines
Reserve Forces and Cadets Association
Volunteer Reserve
Regular Reserve
Military reserve force

References

External links
 Maritime Reserves

Reserve forces of the United Kingdom
Naval units and formations of the United Kingdom
Royal Navy personnel